The Nam Xan River is a major river of west-central Laos.

References

Rivers of Laos
Geography of Bolikhamsai province